The Little Hut is a 1957 British romantic comedy film made by MGM starring Ava Gardner, Stewart Granger and David Niven. It was directed by Mark Robson, produced by Robson and F. Hugh Herbert, from a screenplay by Herbert, adapted by Nancy Mitford from the play La petite hutte by André Roussin.

Plot
High-flying tycoon Sir Philip Ashlow (Granger), his neglected wife, Lady Susan Ashlow (Gardner) and his best friend, pettifogger civil servant Henry Brittingham-Brett (Niven), are shipwrecked on a desert island.

Susan feels neglected and has been trying to make Philip jealous by demonstrating a romantic interest in Henry, who begins taking her seriously. Now that they are alone on the island, Philip constructs a large hut for his wife and himself and a little hut for Henry, but before long Henry is suggesting they share not only food and water but Susan as well.

Opposed to this, Susan nevertheless is offended by Philip's indifferent reaction to Henry's indecent proposal. The quarrel escalates until Philip declares that, as captain of their ship, he feels entitled not only to perform marriages but to grant divorces. He awaits Susan's decision on whether the men should change huts or share and share alike.

This potential ménage à trois where the two men are competing for the lady's attention is interrupted by a fourth visitor. The stranger is dressed in native garb and takes Susan captive, but is soon revealed to be Mario, the chef from their yacht, indulging a whim. The laughter from inside the hut between Susan and Mario is misinterpreted by Henry and her husband as being romantic in nature, arousing jealousy from both men.

After their rescue and return to society, Henry comes to visit Susan to propose they be together. But when he finds her and Philip in domestic repose, and Susan knitting baby booties, he knows the battle for her love is lost.

Cast
 Ava Gardner as Lady Susan Ashlow
 Stewart Granger as Sir Philip Ashlow
 David Niven as Henry Brittingham-Brett
 Walter Chiari as Mario
 Finlay Currie as The Reverend Bertram Brittingham-Brett
 Jean Cadell as Mrs. Hermione Brittingham-Brett
 Jack Lambert as Captain MacWalt
 Henry Oscar as Mr. Trollope
 Viola Lyel as Miss Edwards
 Jaron Yaltan as Indian Gentleman
 Richard Wattis as Official

Original play
The script of The Little Hut was written by the French writer André Roussin, based on his own play La petite hutte (1947). Both play and script are based on another play in Catalan, written by the novelist and playwright Carles Soldevila (1892–1967): Civilitzats tanmateix (Nevertheless civilized) (1921). This play was known in France through a translation by Adolphe de Faigairolle and Francesc Presas, published in 1927 in the magazine Candide.

The play ran for over 1,500 performances in Paris, was translated into English by Nancy Mitford and ran for three years in the West End, starting in 1950 with Robert Morley and David Tomlinson (with Roger Moore as their understudy) at the Lyric Theatre before being made into the film.

The play flopped on Broadway in 1953 despite being directed by Peter Brook. Robert Morley was unable to reprise his performance in New York due to a tax situation.

In 2010, the play was revived starring Aden Gillett and Janie Dee.

Production
There was reluctance to obtain the screen rights due to concern about censorship. In February 1955 F Hugh Herbert and Mark Robson announced they had formed a company to purchase the film rights to the play and make a movie from it.

Herbert had written The Moon Is Blue, which had famously been released without a seal of approval from the Production Code. However Herbert said "after that episode I was determined not to make another picture without a seal."

The screenplay made a number of changes from the play. In the play, the affair was real, but in the film. the wife only pretended to get her husband interested in her. Robson said Herbert had proved with The Moon Is Blue that the censors did not mind if characters "talked about sex as much as you want – as long as nothing happens." The boyfriend became an old admirer of the woman, and the woman and her husband were given a divorce on board the ship. Also a dog was added to interrupt any potential sex moments.

Herbert completed the script by January 1956 and David Niven, Noël Coward and Clifton Webb were being discussed for the male leads. Audrey Hepburn and Mel Ferrer were also discussed. By April, the lead roles had been cast: Niven, Ava Gardner and Stewart Granger. They made the film independently but did a deal with MGM to finance which involved MGM loaning their contract players Stewart Granger and Ava Gardner.

Herbert said it "doesn't matter much where we make the film since 75% of it takes place on a desert island."

It was planned to shoot the whole film in England, but a shortage of suitable studio space made this impossible. The film was shot in England and Italy over August to September 1956, with six weeks filming at the Cinecittà Studios in Rome and some background filming in Italy. Post production was done in England.

Reception
According to MGM records, the film earned $2,085,000 in North America and $1,515,000 elsewhere, making a profit of $340,000.

It did not perform well at the French box office with admissions of only 591,767.

Mark Robson signed Walter Chiari to a five-picture contract on the basis of his performance calling him a "new Maurice Chevalier".

Notes and references

External links
 
 
 
 
 Review of film at Variety

1957 films
British films based on plays
American films based on plays
Films directed by Mark Robson
Metro-Goldwyn-Mayer films
1957 romantic comedy films
American romantic comedy films
British romantic comedy films
Films set on uninhabited islands
1950s English-language films
1950s American films
1950s British films